The 1997–98 Slovak 1.Liga season was the fifth season of the Slovak 1. Liga, the second level of ice hockey in Slovakia. 12 teams participated in the league, and SK Iskra Banska Bystrica won the championship.

Standings

External links
 Season on hockeyarchives.info

Slovak 1. Liga
Slovak 1. Liga seasons
Liga